Rotherham Interchange is a bus station serving the town of Rotherham, South Yorkshire. It consists of 24 bus stands located inside the main Interchange building in Rotherham town centre, next to the College Walk shopping centre which leads out onto Frederick Street. It is the main hub for bus services in the Rotherham area, and is located a short walk over the Chantry Bridge over the River Don from Rotherham Central station on the National Rail and Sheffield Supertram networks.

On 15 May 2016 the Interchange suffered major damage after a Stagecoach bus caught fire inside the building in a suspected arson attack. The bus station was closed for several days before reopening after temporary repairs were made. On 29 April 2018, the bus station was closed for more permanent repairs and a full refurbishment costing £12 million; it reopened on 3 March 2019. During the closure of Rotherham Interchange, bus services departed from Greasbrough Road and a temporary bus station on the site of the former Forge Island Tesco supermarket.

Services 

, the stand allocation is:

References

External links
Rotherham bus station on Travel South Yorkshire's interactive map

Bus stations in South Yorkshire
Buildings and structures in Rotherham